Mountain American Center is a multi-purpose arena and convention center under construction in Idaho Falls, Idaho. It is scheduled to open on November 28, 2022.

References

External links

 

Idaho Falls, Idaho
Indoor arenas in Idaho